The McIntire School of Commerce is the University of Virginia's undergraduate business school and graduate business school for Commerce, Global Commerce, Accounting, Management of Information Technology, and Business Analytics. It was founded in 1921 through a gift by Paul Goodloe McIntire.

The two-year McIntire program offers undergraduate students B.S. degrees in Commerce with concentrations in Accounting, Finance, Information Technology, Management, and Marketing. Undergraduate students at UVA apply to gain admission during their second year; upon acceptance, they enter the Commerce school at the start of their third year. Some students apply during their third year, and will enter upon their fourth year (thus spending a total of five years as an undergraduate as McIntire offers a two-year program).

McIntire offers five graduate programs: M.S. in Commerce, M.S. in Global Commerce, M.S. in Accounting, M.S. in Management of Information Technology, and M.S. in Business Analytics, the latter delivered in partnership with the Darden School of Business.

McIntire also offers certificate programs in business for non-business students, graduates, and working professionals in academic-year residential, summer residential, and online formats.

History
In 1920, the University of Virginia began offering students majoring in economics the opportunity to specialize in business administration. One year later a $200,000 donation from stockbroker, alumnus and Charlottesville philanthropist Paul Goodloe McIntire made the establishment of the McIntire School of Commerce and Business Administration possible.  Over the next three decades McIntire operated as a separate entity from the College of Arts and Sciences, but worked closely with the James Wilson School of Economics. In 1952, the University's Board of Visitors approved the establishment of the McIntire School as a professional school to be administered as a separate unit of the University, distinct from the College.

Monroe Hall was opened in 1930 and became the home for the McIntire School.

Academics
McIntire offers degrees in the following disciplines:

B.S. in Commerce
The B.S. in Commerce is a 57-credit-hour upper-divisional school program for third- and fourth-year UVA students.

Students apply for enrollment at McIntire during the spring of their second year. Students accepted into the program begin coursework in the fall of their third year.  Once they begin, students are enrolled in a 12-credit, block-style class called the Integrated Core Experience (the "ICE Block"). Blocks are taught by a group of professors, with each professor specializing in an aspect of business (marketing, finance, communications, strategy, systems, organizational behavior, and quantitative analysis). Professors conduct subject-based coursework on a rotating basis.

During the first semester at McIntire, students while in their ICE Blocks are assigned to teams. Each team assumes the role of an analyst, and works on a semester-long project for one of four Fortune 500 companies (CarMax, AB InBev, Hilton, or Margaritaville in the 2018-2019 academic year). The team-based project requires students to advise senior management on a problem or objective the company is facing.

Students then specialize in one of five "concentrations": Accounting, Finance, Information Technology, Management, and Marketing (International Business was offered in the past as a concentration, but has since been discontinued). Depending on the requirements of the concentration, students begin taking classes for their concentration either in the second or third semester at McIntire. Each concentration has its own coursework, with some required courses fixed for the concentration and other required courses offered to students as a choice of electives; the level of course required, both fixed and electives, varies from concentration to concentration. The Finance concentration, for example, has four required fixed courses plus one required elective (from a selection of various courses), while the Marketing concentration has one fixed requirement plus two required electives (also from a selection of various courses). Students who wish to are able to select more than one concentration, but cannot choose more than two concentrations.

McIntire students can also choose to study in an area of specialty that spans across several disciplines, called a "track". Generally, students may select a track during the spring semester of the third year or the start of the fourth year. McIntire students may complete up to two tracks if course scheduling allows, but cannot complete three or more tracks. McIntire offers tracks in Advertising and Digital Media, Business Analytics, Entrepreneurship, Global Commerce, Quantitative Finance, and Real Estate.

M.S. in Commerce

The ten-month, 40-credit-hour M.S. in Commerce integrates foundational business skills, a specialization in business analytics, finance, or marketing & management, and concludes with the Global Immersion Experience (GIE). The required GIE is an in-depth overview of your designated region during a one-week residency in Charlottesville, followed by overseas travel with a class cohort on an intensive three-week schedule of academic, company, and cultural visits.

M.S. in Global Commerce

The M.S. in Global Commerce is a three-continent, one-year program designed for recent high-potential business or management major graduates with little to no prior work experience. Students learn in three different locations and earn the M.S. in Global Commerce from UVA McIntire in Charlottesville, Virginia at UVA, as well as an M.S. in Global Strategic Management from ESADE Business School in Barcelona, Spain, and a certificate in International Business from Lingnan (University) College at Sun Yat-sen University.

M.S. in Accounting

McIntire's M.S. in Accounting is a nine-month, 30-credit-hour program that prepares students for professional practice by sharpening the analytical and technical skills they need to excel in the field of accounting.

M.S. in Management of Information Technology

The M.S. in MIT is a one-year program that integrates technical and business-related knowledge and skills. The program helps students understand how current and emerging technologies can best be applied to make their organizations more profitable, productive, and competitive. The executive format of the program allows working professionals from a wide range of industries and functional areas of expertise to remain on the job while completing their degree.

M.S. in Business Analytics

The M.S. in Business Analytics is a one-year program delivered by McIntire faculty in collaboration with UVA’s Darden School of Business at the University's facilities in the downtown Arlington, Va., district of Rosslyn. Intended for early-career professionals with a minimum of two years of work experience, the program combines weekend, in-person sessions, and online instruction, to offer students a broad mix of analytical and technical skills as well as foundational business knowledge and leadership instruction.

McIntire Certificate Programs 

McIntire offers graduate certificates in Business Fundamentals, Sustainable Business, Business Essentials, Cybersecurity for Business Leaders, as well as individual modular courses in Executive Management. Courses are delivered in multiple formats including academic-year residential, summer residential, and online.

Rankings
In 2009, McIntire was ranked number one nationally for undergraduate business schools by Bloomberg BusinessWeek. Between 2011, the same magazine ranked McIntire second in the country, praising the school's academics.

In 2012, McIntire was ranked as America's 5th best undergraduate business school by U.S. News & World Report.

In 2015, the M.S. in Commerce was ranked 1st among one-year, pre-work-experience master's in management programs by higher education research website Value Colleges.

In 2017, McIntire's B.S. in Commerce ranked as third best undergraduate business program overall in the U.S. by business education website Poets&Quants, and was ranked 1st in the U.S. by alumni satisfaction for student experience.

In 2017, McIntire's M.S. in Commerce program ranked 2nd worldwide in master's in management (MiM) programs by The Economist, and was the only U.S. school to appear in the top ten.

In 2018, McIntire's B.S. in Commerce ranked as the 2nd best undergraduate business program overall in the U.S. by business education website Poets&Quants, and was ranked 1st in the U.S. by alumni satisfaction for student experience.

In 2019, The Economist ranked McIntire's M.S. in Commerce degree as the top U.S.-based master’s in management program and No. 6 worldwide.

In 2020, Global education organization QS ranked McIntire’s M.S. in Global Commerce the #3 multi-campus program in its QS World Universities Rankings®. The program also known as Global 3 signifying its unique partnership with two other international institutions, was also named as the #11 master’s in management program out of 152 in the world.

In 2021, McIntire's B.S. in Commerce once again ranked as the 2nd best undergraduate business program overall in the U.S. by business education website Poets&Quants, and was ranked 1st in the U.S. by alumni satisfaction for student experience, maintaining a top three spot on the list for the fourth consecutive year.

Back to the Lawn 

The McIntire School has moved from its original location in Monroe Hall to Rouss Hall. This migration, entitled "Back to the Lawn" by the school, began in April 2005, and was completed in December 2007. The move entailed an extensive expansion and renovation of Rouss Hall to fit the needs of the Commerce School. The 132,000-square-foot Robertson Hall adjoins historic Rouss Hall, creating a 156,000-square-foot academic complex on the Lawn. The major renovation of Rouss Hall and the construction of the adjoining Robertson Hall created a new academic complex to house the McIntire School of Commerce, and to fit the School's new and expanding needs. Some of the extensive renovations and expansions includes, among others, a state-of-the-art computer-trading center, computer labs, conference rooms, study lounges, student lounges, and meeting rooms.

Monroe Hall is now occupied by the offices of the Undergraduate Association Deans for the College and Graduate School of Arts & Sciences, as well as the Department of Economics. The former occupy the original south portion of the building, while the latter occupies the Balfour Addition on the north side of Monroe Hall (prior to 2005, the Department of Economics was located in Rouss Hall; effectively, the Department of Economics and the McIntire School of Commerce traded buildings).

Notable alumni 

 Tiki Barber, former professional football player
 Ronde Barber, former professional football player
 Ben Olsen, former professional soccer player and former coach of D.C. United
 Charles L. Glazer, former U.S. Ambassador to El Salvador
 Brereton Jones, former Governor of Kentucky
 Alexis Ohanian, co-founder of Reddit
 Ben Pollack, world record-holding powerlifter

References 

University of Virginia schools
Business schools in Virginia
1921 establishments in Virginia
Educational institutions established in 1921